Aletris, the colicroot, colicweed, crow corn, or unicorn root, is a genus of flowering plants in the family Nartheciaceae, native to North America and to eastern and southeastern Asia, especially China. It was used as a component in Lydia Pinkham's original Vegetable Compound.

Species
Aletris species include:

 Aletris alpestris Diels. - Guizhou, Shaanxi, Sichuan, Yunnan 
 Aletris aurea Walter - from Texas and Oklahoma to Maryland
 Aletris bracteata Northr. - Florida, Bahamas
 Aletris capitata F.T.Wang & Tang - Sichuan
 Aletris cinerascens F.T.Wang & Tang - Yunnan, Guangxi
 Aletris farinosa L. - Ontario and much of eastern United States
 Aletris foliata (Maxim.) Makino & Nemoto - Korea, Japan
 Aletris foliolosa Stapf - Sumatra, Sabah, Mindoro
 Aletris foliosa (Maxim.) Bureau & Franch. - Japan
 Aletris glabra Bureau & Franch. - Nepal, Bhutan, Sikkim, Tibet, Fujian, Gansu, Guizhou, Hubei, Jiangxi, Shaanxi, Sichuan, Taiwan, Yunnan 
 Aletris glandulifera Bureau & Franch. - Gansu, Shaanxi, Sichuan
 Aletris gracilis Rendle - Nepal, Bhutan, Arunachal Pradesh, Myanmar, Tibet, Yunnan
 Aletris laxiflora Bureau & Franch. - Tibet, Sichuan, Guizhou
 Aletris lutea Small - Florida, Georgia, Alabama, Mississippi, Louisiana
 Aletris megalantha F.T.Wang & Tang - Yunnan
 Aletris nana S.C.Chen - Tibet,  Yunnan, Nepal
 Aletris obovata Nash - - Florida, Georgia, Alabama, Mississippi, South Carolina
 Aletris pauciflora (Klotzsch) Hand.-Mazz - Tibet,  Yunnan, Nepal, Bhutan, Assam, Myanmar, northern India
 Aletris pedicellata F.T.Wang & Tang - Sichuan
 Aletris scopulorum Dunn - Shikoku, Fujian, Guangdong, Hunan, Jiangxi, Zhejiang 
 Aletris simpliciflora R.Li & Shu D.Zhang - Tibet
 Aletris spicata (Thunb.) Franch. - Philippines, Taiwan, Japan, Korea, Ryukyu Islands, much of China
 Aletris stenoloba Franch. - Gansu, Guangdong, Guangxi, Guizhou, Hubei, Shaanxi, Sichuan, Yunnan
 Aletris × tottenii E.T.Browne - Georgia   (hybrid, A. lutea × A. obovata)
 Aletris yaanica G.H.Yang - Sichuan

References

Nartheciaceae
Dioscoreales genera